Further Up the Creek is a 1958 British comedy film written and directed by Val Guest and starring David Tomlinson, Frankie Howerd, Shirley Eaton, Thora Hird, Desmond Llewelyn and Lionel Jeffries. It served as a follow up to Up the Creek, with Peter Sellers not reprising his role because it clashed with the filming of The Mouse That Roared. Frankie Howerd replaced him.

Plot
Navy frigate the "Aristotle" is sold to a Middle Eastern power, and against regulations the ship's bosun tries to make a profit by selling tickets to passengers seeking a luxury cruise. When the Captain discovers what is going on, he attempts to straighten things out.

Cast
 David Tomlinson as Lieutenant Fairweather
 Frankie Howerd as Bosun
 Shirley Eaton as Jane
 Thora Hird as Mrs. Galloway
 Lionel Jeffries as Steady Barker
 Lionel Murton as Perkins
 David Lodge as Scouse
 John Warren as Cooky
 Sam Kydd as Bates
 Edwin Richfield as Bennett
 Peter Collingwood as Chippy
 Ian Whittaker as Lofty
 Harry Landis as Webster
 Esma Cannon as Maudie
 Tom Gill as Philippe
 Jack Le White as Kentoni Brother
 Max Day as Kentoni Brother
 Eric Pohlmann as President
 Michael Goodliffe as Lieutenant Commander
 Basil Dignam as Flagship Commander
 Judith Furse as Chief Wren
 Ballard Berkeley as Whacker Payne
 Michael Ripper as	Ticket Collector
 Stanley Unwin as Porter
 John Stuart as Admiral
 Patrick Holt as First Lieutenant (uncredited)

Critical reception
TV Guide wrote, "less rather than more, as most follow-ups are."

References

External links

1958 films
1958 comedy films
British comedy films
1950s English-language films
Films directed by Val Guest
Films set on ships
Military humor in film
British sequel films
Hammer Film Productions films
1950s British films